Tea Times is an album by the jazz pianist Junko Onishi, recorded and released in 2016.

Track listing 

 Miho Hazama - Horn section arrange (M5)
 Ryoji Ihara - Transcription、Horn coordinat (M4)
 Naruyoshi Kikuchi - Edit

Personnel 
 Junko Onishi - Piano
 Terreon Gully - drums
 Yunior Terry - Bass
 Horns
 Tokuhiro Doi - Alto saxophone, Clarinet
 Kazuhiro Kondo - Alto saxophone
 Ryoji Ihara - Tenor saxophone, Flute
 Masakuni Takeno - Tenor saxophone
 Kei Suzuki - Baritone saxophone
 Eijiro Nakagawa - Trombone
 Nobuhide Handa - Trombone
 Ryota Sasaguri - Trombone
 Koichi Nonoshita - Bass trombone
 Eric Miyashiro - Trumpet
 Koji Nishimura - Trumpet
 Masahiko Sugasaka - Trumpet
 Atsushi Osawa - Trumpet
Yosuke Miyajima - Guitar
 Naruyoshi Kikuchi (N/K from JAZZ DOMMUNISTERS) - Rap (M8)
 OMSB (from SHIMI LAB) - Rap (M8, M9)
 JUMA (from SHIMI LAB) - Rap (M9)
 Saya Yoshida - Chorus (M9)
 Ayumu Yahaba - Chorus (M9)

M4
 Ryoji Ihara - Tenor saxophone, Flute
 Tokuhiro Doi - Alto saxophone
 Kei Suzuki - Baritone saxophone
 Eijiro Nakagawa - Trombone
 Nobuhide Handa - Trombone
 Ryota Sasaguri - Trombone
 Eric Miyashiro - Trumpet
 Koji Nishimura - Trumpet
 Masahiko Sugasaka - Trumpet
 Atsushi Osawa - Trumpet

Production 
 Producer - Naruyoshi Kikuchi
 Recording Director & Coordinator - Tomohiro Oya (mimi-tab.)
 Recording and mixing engineer - Takashi Akaku (mimi-tab.)
Recorded at Sony Music Studios Tokyo, Studio FAVRE
Mixed at Studio FAVRE
 Assistant engineer - Takemasa Kosaka, Yuta Yoneyama
 Mastering engineer - Koji Suzuki (Sony Music Studios Tokyo)
Mastering at Sony Music Studios Tokyo
 Piano Tuniner - Megumi Omamiuda
 Pre production - Kei Maruyama, Shiro Tanaka
 Cover photo - Naruyoshi Kikuchi
 Booklet Photo - Hiroshi Nirei
 Hair and Make-up Artist - Eiichi Ikeda (ZENO)
 Art direction - Tadashi Kitagawa
 Coordination - Yuki Kaihori
TABOO Label
Label Producer - Hiroshi Fujiyoshi
Label Administration - Miyuki Adachi, Masahiro Komai
Business Affairs - Hisae Seki
International Affairs - Sanpei Yamaguchi, Eri Komazaki
 Executive Producers - Akira Takahashi, Michihiko Nakayama, Kenichi Hirose

Release history

References

External links
 

2016 albums
Junko Onishi albums